Codrington Lagoon is a long lagoon which takes up much of the west of the Caribbean island of Barbuda. Its access to the sea was once only via Cuffy Creek, at the northern tip of the lagoon, but in 2019 the western edge of the lagoon was destroyed by storms and the lagoon is now completely open to the sea. The water is shallow, and much of the shore of the northern half of the lagoon is marshland. The town of Codrington, the main settlement on the island, is located on the eastern shore of the lagoon.

Frigatebird colony
To the north of Codrington is a frigatebird colony, centered on the lagoon's tiny Man of War Island, a forty-minute boat ride from Antigua. The colony, known as the Frigate Bird Sanctuary, is one of the main ecotourism attractions in Barbuda. During the mating season, from September to April, this rare bird displays a huge scarlet throat pouch to attract a female mate; the pair will lay one egg on a nest built precariously on the mangrove. These birds cannot walk or swim; they soar high in the clouds and live solely on fish, which they often steal from other birds, giving them their local name, Man of war. They have few predators here, making this nesting site is one of the most important in the world for these endangered birds.

Codrington Lagoon's magnificent frigatebird colony, the largest in the Caribbean region, had an estimated 2,500 nesting pairs prior to Hurricane Irma landfall in September 2017. The lagoon was inundated by Hurricane Irma's storm surge and its impact on the colony is still unknown.

References 

Bodies of water of Antigua and Barbuda
Geography of Barbuda
Ramsar sites in Antigua and Barbuda